Alexandr Hilário Takeda Sakai dos Santos Fier (born 11 March 1988) is a Brazilian chess grandmaster. He competed in the FIDE World Cup in 2009, 2011, 2013, 2015 and 2017.

Career
Fier won five gold medals at the Pan American Youth Chess Festival: in the Under 10 division in 1996 and 1997, the Under 12 in 2000, the Under 14 in 2002 and Under 18 in 2005. He also won the South American Junior Championship in 2006, 2008 and 2009. Fier won the Brazilian Chess Championship in 2005 and 2018. In 2006 he won the 65 Anos da Federação Paulista tournament (65 Years São Paulo Federation tournament) in São Paulo.

Fier won the Open of Sants, Hostafrancs & La Bordeta in Barcelona in 2009 and 2014. Also in 2009, he took part for the first time in the World Cup, where he was knocked out by Alexander Khalifman in the first round. In the 2011 edition, Fier beat Wang Yue by 1½-½ in the first round to advance to round two. Here he was eliminated by Alexander Morozevich. Two months later, Fier won the 2nd Latin American Cup in Montevideo edging out Diego Flores on tiebreak. In the Chess World Cup 2013, Fier defeated Radoslaw Wojtaszek in round one to advance to round two, in which he lost to B. Adhiban and thus was eliminated from the competition. In 2015 he lost in the first round to Julio Granda Zuniga. In 2017 he lost in the first round to Étienne Bacrot.

Fier has played on the Brazilian national team in the Chess Olympiad, the World Team Chess Championship, the Pan American Team Chess Championship and the Mercosur Chess Olympiad. In 2009, his team won the gold medal in the latter two competitions.

Personal life
Born in Joinville, Brazil, Fier lives in Georgia. He is married to Nino Maisuradze, also a chess player. Fier is of Japanese and Italian descent.

References

External links

 
 
 
 Alexandr Fier chess games at 365Chess.com
 Alexander Hilario T Fier chess games (2004–2007) at 365Chess.com
 Alexandr Fier team chess record at Olimpbase.org

1988 births
Living people
Chess grandmasters
Brazilian chess players
Chess Olympiad competitors
People from Joinville
Brazilian emigrants to Georgia
Brazilian people of Japanese descent
Brazilian people of Italian descent
Brazilian people of German descent